Çölquşçu (also, Çöl Quşçu, Chël’ Kushchu, Cholkushchi, Cholkushchu, and Nizhniye Kushchi) is a village and municipality in the Davachi Rayon of Azerbaijan.  It has a population of 720.

References 

Populated places in Shabran District